Magdalena Wunderlich (born May 16, 1952 in Großhesselohe, Pullach) is a West German retired slalom canoeist who competed in the early and mid 1970s. She won a bronze medal in the K-1 event at the 1972 Summer Olympics in Munich.

References
Sports-reference.com profile

1952 births
Canoeists at the 1972 Summer Olympics
Living people
Olympic canoeists of West Germany
Olympic bronze medalists for West Germany
West German female canoeists
Olympic medalists in canoeing
Medalists at the 1972 Summer Olympics